ISO 6862 is an International Standard and a character set developed by ISO.

Character set

References 

06862